The Toledo City Paper is an alternative newspaper established in 1997 in Toledo, Ohio, United States of America. It was co-founded by Collette Jacobs and Becky Harris, who also co-established a number of other local newspapers in Ohio and Michigan.

References

External links
 

1997 establishments in Ohio
Newspapers published in Ohio
Newspapers established in 1997
Mass media in Toledo, Ohio